(1549 – July 13, 1640) was a Japanese samurai of the late Sengoku period through early Edo period. He was the son of Oniniwa Yoshinao.  His half-sister, Katakura Kita was also Katakura Kagetsuna's half sister. Together with Katakura Kagetsuna and Date Shigezane, Tsunamoto was known as one of the "Three Great Men of the Date Clan".

Tsunamoto served the Date clan, and by the end of his life was the only Date retainer who was both older than and outlived Date Masamune. 

Tsunamoto succeeded to the family headship following the death of his father at the Battle of Hitotoribashi in 1585. He was fought at Battle of Suriagehara in 1589, participate to suppressed Kunohe Rebellion in 1591, and Korean campaign in 1592. Tsunamoto deeply trusted by Masamune, he was made a senior retainer at the young age of 35. 

After the Bunroku Campaign, Hideyoshi suspected Masamune of treason, it was Tsunamoto who pleaded on his lord's behalf. His conduct was said to have impressed Hideyoshi so much that he gave him one of his concubines as a reward, though this remains unconfirmed. Another story has Tsunamoto change his name to "Moniwa Nobumoto" (茂庭延元) to placate the Taikō; according to sources, Hideyoshi was superstitious of the "Oniniwa" name because of its meaning, "the garden of the demon".

After spending several years as an attendant for Masamune's son Hidemune, Tsunamoto retired from the Date clan and became a Buddhist monk. After his death, he was succeeded by his son Moniwa Yoshimoto (Yoshitsuna) (1575–1663).

Descendant
Moniwa Masumoto
Moniwa Takamoto (1854–1919)

In fiction
In NHK's 1987 Taiga drama Dokuganryū Masamune, Tsunamoto was played by Takehiro Murata.

References

Samurai
1549 births
1640 deaths
Date retainers
Date clan